Robert Talarek (born 3 June 1983) is a Polish professional boxer in Middleweight division.

Boxing career 

Talarek's professional boxing debut took place on 6 April 2013 in Kalisz where he defeated Rafał Piotrowski by UD in 4th.

On 10 December 2016 Talarek fought Goekalp Oezekler in Germany for vacant IBF East/West Europe Middleweight title, winning by TKO in 7th.

Private life 
Throughout his boxing career Talarek has worked as a miner.

Professional boxing record

References

External links 
 

Living people
Polish male boxers
1983 births
People from Garwolin County
Middleweight boxers